Walter Hamilton may refer to:

 Walter Hamilton (VC) (1856–1879), Irish recipient of the Victoria Cross
 Walter Hamilton (Master of Magdalene College) (1908–1988), English educator
 Walter Hamilton (airline executive) (1901–1946), Airline founder and executive
 Walter Hamilton (politician) (1863–1955), Australian politician
 Walter Kerr Hamilton (1808–1869), Anglican Bishop of Salisbury, 1854–1869
 Walter Ferrier Hamilton (1819–1872), British Liberal politician